David L. Early (May 30, 1938 – March 23, 2013) was an American actor and teacher, best known for his work on various television series, motion pictures, and theater.

Life and career
Born in the Pittsburgh suburb of East Liberty, Early graduated from Peabody High School and served in the U.S. Navy and Merchant Marine, before earning a bachelor of science degree in elementary education in 1971 from the University of Pittsburgh.

In 1978, after a few years working in theater, he made his on-camera debut on Dawn of the Dead. Although he had some guest spots on TV shows such as Quincy, M.E., Tales from the Darkside, and The West Wing, Early had always been known for cult classic films like Creepshow and The Silence of the Lambs.

Aside from acting, Early had also taught acting and worked on plays and short stories.

Early died of cancer at his daughter's home in Clearwater, Florida. He was 74 years old.

Filmography

Film
Dawn of the Dead (1978) - Mr. Berman
Knightriders (1981) - Bleoboris
Creepshow (1982) - White (segment "They're Creeping Up On You")
The Prince of Pennsylvania (1988) - Deputy #2
Monkey Shines (1988) - Anesthetist
The Silence of the Lambs (1991) - Spooked Memphis Cop
Passed Away (1992) - Councilman Chaney
Innocent Blood (1992) - Reporter #2
The Dark Half (1993) - Officer #2
Double Dragon (1994) - Security Man
Houseguest (1995) - Security Guard
The Korean (2008) - Captain Milcoy
Zack and Miri Make a Porno (2008) - Auditioner
Sonny Days (2012) - Wendell
One for the Money (2012) - Carmen's Neighbor
Zombie Mutation (2012) - News Reporter (final film role)

Television
Mister Rogers' Neighborhood (1979, 1 episode) - Himself
Quincy, M.E. (1981, 1 episode) - Assistant Director
Tales from the Darkside (1985, 1 episode) - Telephone Caller
Alone in the Neon Jungle (1988, Movie) - Duke
No Place Like Home (1989, Movie) - Crack Addict
Bump in the Night (1991, TV Movie) - Salesman
The 10 Million Dollar Getaway (1991, TV Movie) - Cargo Clerk
Citizen Cohn (1992, TV Movie) - Chauffeur
The West Wing (2002, 1 episode) - Bartender

Documentary
The Dead Will Walk (2004) - Himself
Blood on the Land: The Making of a King (2004) - Himself
Just Desserts: The Making of Creepshow (2007) - Himself

References

External links
 

1938 births
2013 deaths
Deaths from cancer in Florida
American male film actors
African-American male actors
American male television actors
20th-century African-American people
21st-century African-American people